Babu Antony (born 22 February 1966) is an Indian-American actor and martial artist, who works primarily in Malayalam cinema. He has also acted in several Tamil, Telugu, Kannada, Sinhalese, Hindi and English films. He started his career doing antagonistic roles and progressed to supporting and leading roles as well. Babu owns a mixed martial art academy in Houston.

He made his debut in Bharathan's Chilampu (1986). His career highlights include Vaishali (1988), Aparahnam (1991) and Uppukandam Brothers (1993).

Early life
He was born to T.J. Antony and Mariyam Antony in Ponkunnam, Kerala, India. He was educated in Sacred Heart High School, Government Boys High School and St. Dominic's High School Kanjirappally. He graduated in English literature from Pune. He has a master's degree in Business Administration in Human resources from Symbiosis Institute of Business Management, Pune. He worked as a cinematographer in Film and Television Institute of India, Pune which led to his entry into the film industry. He has a Fifth Dan Black Belt in martial arts.

Career

Early in his career, he started playing in appearance roles like Shathru (1985), Mizhineerppoovukal (1986) in Malayalam. He made a mark through Fazil's 1986 thriller Poovinu Puthiya Poonthennal. The film was remade into Tamil, Telugu, Kannada and Hindi. Babu reprised his role in all the five versions. He made his debut by playing an antagonist in Bharathan's Chilambu (1987).

In 1987, he appears for its debut in Tamil cinema with Sathyaraj in Poovizhi Vasalile and then Makkal En Pakkam. Later with Kamal Haasan's Vrutham (1987) in Malayalam and Per Sollum Pillai in Tamil. With Nizhalgal Ravi, he acted in horror film, Veendum Lisa which were all commercial successes. He also played with Chiranjeevi in Pasivadi Pranam and  Jebu Donga which later hit at the box office. He started his career as a villain and later on featured in lead roles with the image of an angry young man.

His debut film in Kannada was Shanti Kranti (1991).  His movies like Aparahnam (1991), Gandhari (1993), Rajadhani (1994), Bharanakoodam (1994),  Chantha (1995), Special Squad (1995) and Indian Military Intelligence (1995) helped him to build a large audience and fan following for him. Apart from these, he has worked in many different characters such as an ex-terrorist role in Aparahnam, king's role in Vaishali (1988), an impecunious in Sayahnam (2000). Uppukandam Brothers (1993) gave a breakthrough for Babu's career in starring roles.

He made his debut in Hindi cine-industry with a movie Hatya in 1988. He is also in Telugu films including Lorry Driver (1990), Sathruvu (1991) and Nippu Ravva (1993). His debut movies in English Made in USA (2005) and Leader (2009) in Sinhala. His other Tamil hits were Anjali (1990), Surieyan (1992), Airport (1993), Attahasam (2004), Vinnaithaandi Varuvaayaa (2010), Kanchana (2011), Aadhi-Bhagavan (2013), Kaaviya Thalaivan (2014), Kaaka Muttai (2015), Adanga Maru (2018) and Ponniyin Selvan (2022).

Personal life
He is married to Evgeniya Antony, who is a Russian American. The couple has two sons, Arthur Antony and Alex Antony. He trains his sons in martial arts and Arthur got his 1st Dan Black Belt in MMA.

Filmography

References

External links

http://en.msidb.org/displayProfile.php?category=actors&artist=Babu%20Antony&limit=59
www.babuantony.com

Indian male film actors
Indian Christians
Male actors from Kerala
Male actors in Malayalam cinema
Living people
People from Kottayam district
20th-century Indian male actors
21st-century Indian male actors
Male actors in Kannada cinema
Male actors in Telugu cinema
Male actors in Hindi cinema
Male actors in Tamil cinema
Indian male mixed martial artists
1966 births